Haji Muhammad Subhi Abdilah bin Haji Bakir (born 8 April 1980) is a retired Bruneian international footballer who played for most notably the Brunei M-League representative team and Brunei DPMM FC as a right-sided midfielder. He also played as a right wing-back for DPMM later in his career.

Club career
Subhi played for the Brunei representative team starting in 2000 when he was drafted in to replace several players who retired immediately after winning the 1999 Malaysia Cup. When DPMM FC replaced his team in the Malaysia Premier League in 2005, he joined Wijaya FC for the 2005–06 Brunei Premier League. He moved to DPMM in 2006, gaining promotion to the Malaysia Super League in his first season and finishing third in the following season. He scored the 1-1 equalizer against Korea National Police Agency during a friendly match in 2007.

Subhi would next experience an eventful three years with DPMM, influenced by the deregistration of BAFA by the Registrar of Societies, prompting FIFA to suspend Brunei in 2009. Altogether, Subhi played in Malaysia in 2008, Singapore in 2009 and Brunei in 2010 on loan at AM Gunners.

Subhi was an integral player to DPMM after they returned to the S.League in 2012. He amassed 61 appearances in 3 seasons, winning the Singapore League Cup again twice in 2012 and 2014 to add to the one in 2009. He left DPMM in 2015 to play one last season with his youth club Wijaya FC, alongside fellow veteran Shahrul Rizal Abdul Rahman.

International career

Subhi was the captain of the Brunei Under-23 team that competed at the 2001 SEA Games held in Kuala Lumpur, Malaysia. He made his international debut in March 2003 at the 2004 AFC Asian Cup qualification matches against Maldives and Myanmar.

Subhi's next involvement with the Wasps came at the 2008 AFF Suzuki Cup qualifying round when his then club DPMM was sent to Cambodia as the national team. He played twice for the Wasps in 2014 also for the Suzuki Cup qualifying held in Laos.

Honours
Wijaya FC
 Brunei FA Cup: 2003
 Brunei Super Cup: 2003

Brunei DPMM FC
 Singapore League Cup (3): 2009, 2012, 2014

References

External links

1980 births
Living people
Association football midfielders
Bruneian footballers
Brunei international footballers
DPMM FC players
Wijaya FC players
Brunei (Malaysia Premier League team) players
Competitors at the 2001 Southeast Asian Games
Southeast Asian Games competitors for Brunei